The 1967 New York state election was held on November 7, 1967, to elect two judges to the New York Court of Appeals. In addition, a revised State Constitution was proposed, and rejected; and a $2,500,000,000 transportation bond issue was approved by the voters.

Background
Stanley H. Fuld had been elected Chief Judge in 1966. On December 23, 1966, Governor Nelson A. Rockefeller appointed Appellate Justice Charles D. Breitel, a Republican, to the seat vacated by Fuld, effective January 1, 1967, to fill the vacancy temporarily.

Judge John Van Voorhis would reach the constitutional age limit of 70 years at the end of the year.

The State Constitutional Convention met between April and September 1967, and decided to submit the revised Constitution in one piece to the voters for ratification.

Nominations
The Republican and Democratic state committees met on September 6 at Albany, New York, and cross-endorsed the incumbent Republican Judge Charles D. Breitel and the Democratic Supreme Court Justice Matthew J. Jasen, of Buffalo.

Breitel refused to accept the Conservative endorsement, so they nominated Kenneth J. Mullane.

Result
The jointly nominated candidates were elected. 

The incumbent Breitel was re-elected.

Notes

Sources
Official result: New Charter Lost by 2-Million Votes, New York Times, December 12, 1967, page 37.  Accessed February 2, 2019.

See also
New York state elections

1967
 
New York